Sir Richard St George, 1st Baronet (died 1789) was an Anglo-Irish politician. He was the son of George St George of Wooodsgift, County Kilkenny and Elizabeth  Bligh, daughter of Thomas Bligh, MP and Privy Councillor, of Rathmore, County Meath, and sister of John Bligh, 1st Earl of Darnley. His grandfather Henry St George had been granted the Wooodsgift estate in 1666.

St George sat in the Irish House of Commons as the Member of Parliament for Athlone between 1763 and his death in 1789. On 12 March 1766 he was created a baronet, of Athlone in the Baronetage of Ireland.

He married Sarah Persse, daughter of Robert Persse of Roxborough House, County Galway, (ancestor of Lady Gregory) and Elizabeth  Parsons, and had three sons. He was succeeded in his title by his eldest son, also called Richard St George.

References

Year of birth unknown
1789 deaths
18th-century Anglo-Irish people
Irish MPs 1761–1768
Irish MPs 1769–1776
Irish MPs 1776–1783
Irish MPs 1783–1790
Baronets in the Baronetage of Ireland
Members of the Parliament of Ireland (pre-1801) for County Westmeath constituencies